The 1969–70 season was the 46th season in the existence of AEK Athens F.C. and the 11th consecutive season in the top flight of Greek football. They competed in the Alpha Ethniki and the Greek Cup. The season began on 21 September 1969 and finished on 7 June 1970.

Overview

The second consecutive transitional season for AEK of Branko Stanković. AEK proceeded to a great renewal in their roster. Promising players such as Stefanos Theodoridis and Giorgos Triantafyllou were promoted to the first team, while transfers of young and talented players were made, with Apostolos Toskas being the most important addition. At the same time, players with a huge offer to the club left, such as Sofianidis, Vasiliou, Yordan and the legendary captain, Andreas Stamatiadis.

This season the team did not compete in any European competition. The conquest of the second place in the league was considered a complete success, taking into account the circumstances and the magnitude of Panathinaikos' team at the time. Mimis Papaioannou emerged as the top scorer of the club with 18 goals and second in the league behind Antonis Antoniadis. At the 10th place were Kostas Nikolaidis and Panagiotis Ventouris, with 12 goals each. This season was marked by the bribery scandal of Loukanidis and Syropoulos of Aris by people of the newly-promoted Panachaiki. The evidence were overwhelming and the verdict was issued immediately. Thus, despite the 0–0 draw at Aris Stadium, the match was awarded to Aris with 2–0, and Panachaiki were eliminated from the league and they were zeroed in their remaining 13 matches. As was natural, the team of Patras finished last and were relegated. It was the first time in the history of Greek football that a team was relegated due to bribery.

In the Greek Cup, AEK qualified without a match in the Second Round, where they faced Panathinaikos in a single game at Nea Filadelfeia Stadium and after 120 minutes of football the match found the two teams tied 1–1. The match was led to the penalty shootout, as for the first year the specific procedure was applied, as until then the winner occurred by a draw. At penalties AEK lost 3–5, as Papaioannou and Ventouris sent the ball out.

Players

Squad information

NOTE: The players are the ones that have been announced by the AEK Athens' press release. No edits should be made unless a player arrival or exit is announced. Updated 30 June 1970, 23:59 UTC+2.

Transfers

In

Out

Renewals

Overall transfer activity

Expenditure:  ₯150,000

Income:  ₯0

Net Total:  ₯150,000

Pre-season and friendlies

Alpha Ethniki

League table

Results summary

Results by Matchday

Fixtures

Greek Cup

Matches

Statistics

Squad statistics

! colspan="9" style="background:#FFDE00; text-align:center" | Goalkeepers
|-

! colspan="9" style="background:#FFDE00; color:black; text-align:center;"| Defenders
|-

! colspan="9" style="background:#FFDE00; color:black; text-align:center;"| Midfielders
|-

! colspan="9" style="background:#FFDE00; color:black; text-align:center;"| Forwards
|-

|}

Disciplinary record

|-
! colspan="14" style="background:#FFDE00; text-align:center" | Goalkeepers

|-
! colspan="14" style="background:#FFDE00; color:black; text-align:center;"| Defenders

|-
! colspan="14" style="background:#FFDE00; color:black; text-align:center;"| Midfielders

|-
! colspan="14" style="background:#FFDE00; color:black; text-align:center;"| Forwards

|}

References

External links
AEK Athens F.C. Official Website

AEK Athens F.C. seasons
AEK Athens